Darren Keefe Daye (born November 30, 1960) is an American former professional basketball player.

High school
Daye played high-school basketball with John F. Kennedy High School, in the Granada Hills district of Los Angeles. Daye was the Most Valuable Player of the 1979 McDonald's All-American Game. Playing for the West team, Daye recorded a double-double, with 22 points and 14 rebounds. It was not enough though, as the West lost the game by one point.

College career
Daye attended and played college basketball at UCLA, from 1979 to 1983.

Professional career
Daye was selected by the Washington Bullets, in the third round (57th pick overall) of the 1983 NBA draft. Daye played in five National Basketball Association (NBA) seasons, from 1983 to 1988, with the Bullets, Chicago Bulls, and Boston Celtics. Daye's season with the Celtics in 1987–88, was his final season in the NBA. One of his most notable games was Game 4 of the 1987 Eastern Conference Semifinals against the Milwaukee Bucks when he scored a huge field goal as well as the deciding free throws, all in the second overtime, helping the Celtics win the game.

He later played overseas in Italy, France, and Israel, before he retired from playing professional basketball in 1997.

Personal
Daye's son, Austin Daye, played with Gonzaga University's men's basketball team, and he was drafted 15th overall by the Detroit Pistons in the 2009 NBA draft. Austin also won an NBA championship with the San Antonio Spurs, after they defeated the Miami Heat, in the 2014 NBA Finals.

References

External links

1960 births
Living people
African-American basketball players
American expatriate basketball people in France
American expatriate basketball people in Israel
American expatriate basketball people in Italy
American men's basketball players
Basketball players from Des Moines, Iowa
Boston Celtics players
Chicago Bulls players
Élan Béarnais players
Hapoel Galil Elyon players
Israeli Basketball Premier League players
Lega Basket Serie A players
Maccabi Rishon LeZion basketball players
McDonald's High School All-Americans
Mens Sana Basket players
Parade High School All-Americans (boys' basketball)
Shooting guards
Small forwards
UCLA Bruins men's basketball players
Victoria Libertas Pallacanestro players
Washington Bullets draft picks
Washington Bullets players
21st-century African-American people
20th-century African-American sportspeople